Murugan Ashwin (born 8 September 1990) is an Indian cricketer who plays for Tamil Nadu.

Domestic career
Ashwin made his List A debut on 11 December 2015 in the 2015–16 Vijay Hazare Trophy. He made his Twenty20 debut on 2 January 2016 in the 2015–16 Syed Mushtaq Ali Trophy.

Indian Premier League
Ashwin was bought at the 2016 Indian Premier League auction by the Rising Pune Supergiants for INR 4.5 crores from his base price of INR 10 lakhs. In February 2017, in the 2017 IPL auction, Ashwin was bought by the Delhi Daredevils team for the 2017 Indian Premier League for INR 1 crore.

In January 2018, Ashwin was bought by the Royal Challengers Bangalore in the 2018 IPL auction. In December 2018, he was bought by the Kings XI Punjab in the player auction for the 2019 Indian Premier League.

In February 2022, he has been bought by the Mumbai Indians in the 2022 Indian Premier League auction.

References

External links
 

1990 births
Living people
Indian cricketers
Tamil Nadu cricketers
Cricketers from Chennai
Royal Challengers Bangalore cricketers
Rising Pune Supergiant cricketers
Delhi Capitals cricketers
India Red cricketers
Punjab Kings cricketers
Mumbai Indians cricketers